is the 3rd single of Miho Komatsu released under Amemura O-Town Record label. The single reached #8 rank for first week and sold 44,460 copies. The single charted for 17 weeks and sold totally 294,580 copies.

Track list

In media
Negai Goto Hitotsu Dake
for Anime television series Case Closed (Detective Conan) as 5th ending theme
Ginga
for ABC program Wide ABCDE~su as ending theme

Cover
In 2006, it was covered by Mikuni Shimokawa in her album Remember. In 2008 Aiuchi Rina and U-ka Saegusa in dB covered this song in their single "Nanatsu no Umi o Wataru Kaze no Yō ni".

References 

1998 songs
1998 singles
Miho Komatsu songs
Being Inc. singles
Amemura-O-Town Record singles
Case Closed songs
Songs written by Miho Komatsu
Song recordings produced by Daiko Nagato